Jack Ladyman is an American mechanical engineer and politician. He served as a Republican member for the 59th district of the Arkansas House of Representatives.

Ladyman attended Williams Baptist University, where he earned an associate degree. He then attended the University of Arkansas where he earned a Bachelor of Science degree in Mechanical engineering. In 2015, Ladyman won the election for the 59th district of the Arkansas House of Representatives, in which he was against Ron Carroll. He succeeded Butch Wilkins. Ladyman assumed his office on January 12, 2015. In May 2022, he was nominated as candidate for the 32nd district.

References 

Living people
Place of birth missing (living people)
Year of birth missing (living people)
Republican Party members of the Arkansas House of Representatives
21st-century American politicians
University of Arkansas alumni
American mechanical engineers